Mount Baker station is a light rail station located in Seattle, Washington. It is situated between the Columbia City and Beacon Hill stations on the 1 Line, which runs from Seattle–Tacoma International Airport to Downtown Seattle, the University of Washington, and Northgate as part of the Link light rail system. The elevated station consists of two side platforms located west of the intersection of Rainier Avenue and Martin Luther King Jr. Way in the Mount Baker neighborhood, part of Seattle's Rainier Valley.

A light rail station in the Mount Baker area was first proposed in 1995 and approved the following year. Construction began in late 2005 and the station was opened for regular service on July 18, 2009. Trains serve the station twenty hours a day on most days; the headway between trains is six minutes during peak periods, with less frequent service at other times. Mount Baker station is also served by five King County Metro bus routes that connect it to Downtown, Capitol Hill, Rainier Beach, the Central District, and the University District.

Location

Mount Baker station is located west of the Rainier Avenue and Martin Luther King Jr. Way intersection in the Mount Baker neighborhood of Seattle, at the foot of Beacon Hill. The area surrounding the station consists of single-family detached homes and retail big-box stores, housing 6,675 and employing 2,208 respectively. Nearby pedestrian amenities include a bus station for King County Metro routes one block northeast and an overpass of Rainier Avenue and Martin Luther King Jr. Way connecting to Mount Baker Boulevard and Franklin High School.

In 2014, the Seattle Department of Transportation began planning of its "Accessible Mt. Baker" plan, which would rebuild the street grid surrounding the station and adding facilities for bikes and buses. Part of the $10–20 million plan would move bus stops at the existing off-street transit center to the plaza under Mount Baker station, with bus lanes and a special bus-only street on South Winthrop Street between Rainier Avenue and Martin Luther King Jr. Way; the proposal was funded as part of the "Move Seattle" levy passed by voters in November 2015.

Transit-oriented development

A 10-block,  area surrounding Mount Baker station was designated as the Mount Baker Station Area Overlay District and approved for rezoning by the Seattle City Council in June 2014. The first major development in the rezoned area was the four-story Artspace Mount Baker Lofts, which opened in 2014 and has 57 units and no parking spaces.

The triangular block on the south side of the intersection of Rainier Avenue and Martin Luther King Jr. Way is planned to have two apartment buildings. An affordable housing complex with 95 units managed by Mercy Housing began construction in 2018 on the south side of the block, facing Hanford Street. Crossroads, an eight-story building with 160 units, retail, and 49 parking spaces, is planned on the north side by a private developer. The west side of Mount Baker Station is occupied by the former University of Washington Consolidated Laundry and is proposed for redevelopment into a mixed-use affordable housing complex along with an adjoining property owned by Sound Transit.

History

From 1891 to 1937, the Rainier Valley was served by the Rainier Avenue Electric Railway, an interurban railway on Rainier Avenue that traveled to Downtown Seattle, including a stop at McClellan Street in the vicinity of the modern light rail station. A failed rapid transit proposal published in 1928 by the Seattle Traffic Research Commission recommended that a future southern extension on Rainier Avenue terminate at either McClellan or Winthrop streets in Mount Baker.

A modern light rail system for Seattle was proposed in 1995, including a station at the intersection of Rainier Avenue and McClellan Street in Mount Baker. The proposal was rejected by voters on March 14, 1995, and was condensed into the "Sound Move" that was approved the following November, retaining the proposed station in Mount Baker. In 1999, Sound Transit, the agency charged with planning and constructing the light rail system, chose an elevated station at McClellan Street to be situated between a tunnel under Beacon Hill and a surface line on Martin Luther King Jr. Way as part of the Central Link route (now part of 1 Line). The light rail station, designed by Seattle-based Boxwood and engineered by Federal Way-based BergerABAM, was tentatively named "McClellan Street" and unveiled to the public alongside Beacon Hill station at public hearings held in 2003. The station was named "Mount Baker" after the surrounding neighborhood by the Sound Transit Board in January 2005.

Sound Transit awarded the construction contract for Mount Baker station and the Beacon Hill Tunnel to Japanese general contractors Obayashi Corporation in June 2004 for $280 million, the costliest component of the Central Link project. Construction began in September 2005 with the permanent closure of Stevens Street and utility relocation to clear the station site. By the following April, Obayashi completed erection of columns that would be used to support the elevated guideway and station. Mount Baker station was declared substantially complete in June 2009, excluding work on the elevators and escalators.

Mount Baker station was opened to the public on July 18, 2009, during the first day of Central Link service. The station hosted the ribbon-cutting ceremony for the line and served as the point at which the inaugural trains met and departed with passengers.

Station layout

Mount Baker station, designed by architectural firm Boxwood and engineered by BergerABAM, consists of two elevated station platforms, a community plaza beneath the station building, and a nearby bus station. The station also has 24 spaces in a secured bicycle locker.

The station also houses three art installations as part of the "STart" program, which allocates a percentage of project construction funds to art projects to be used in stations. Sheila Klein's "Sky Within" consists of six chandeliers, recycled from former street lights, that are suspended above the plaza level on the underside of the train guideway. The southbound platform has two stained glass windows made by Guy Kemper, facing away from the station and towards the surrounding neighborhood: "Rain, Steam and Speed" serves as a colorful contrast to  clear and overcast skies, while "Seattle Sunrise" represents a sunrise against the horizon.

The station's pictogram, a pair of mountains, depict Mount Baker and Mount Rainier (both visible from the station). It was created by Christian French as part of the Stellar Connections series and its points represent nearby destinations, including Franklin High School, the former site of Sick's Stadium, Colman Park, Cheasty Boulevard, and Mount Baker Park.

Services

Mount Baker station is part of Sound Transit's 1 Line, which runs from Seattle–Tacoma International Airport through the Rainier Valley, Downtown Seattle, and the University of Washington campus to Northgate. It is the seventh northbound station from Angle Lake and twelfth southbound station from Northgate, and is situated between Columbia City and Beacon Hill stations. 1 Line trains serve Mount Baker twenty hours a day on weekdays and Saturdays, from 5:00 am to 1:00 am, and eighteen hours on Sundays, from 6:00 am to 12:00 am; during regular weekday service, trains operate roughly every eight to ten minutes during rush hour and midday operation, respectively, with longer headways of fifteen minutes in the early morning and twenty minutes at night. During weekends, 1 Line trains arrive at Mount Baker station every ten minutes during midday hours and every fifteen minutes during mornings and evenings. The station is approximately 22 minutes from SeaTac/Airport station and 16 minutes from Westlake station in Downtown Seattle. In 2019, an average of 2,601 passengers boarded Link trains at Mount Baker station on weekdays.

Mount Baker is served by six King County Metro bus routes that stop at the Mount Baker Transit Center, a three-bay bus station located on Forest Street between Rainier Avenue and Martin Luther King Jr. Way that opened on September 19, 2009. Routes 7 and 9 Express run through the transit center, connecting the Rainier Valley to Downtown Seattle and Capitol Hill; Route 8 terminates at Mount Baker, running north to the Central District, Capitol Hill, and the Seattle Center in Uptown; Route 14 runs through the transit center, connecting Downtown and the Mount Baker area of the city (that the station was named after); Route 48 terminates at Mount Baker, running north to the University District via the Central District; Route 106, which begins in the International District, switches to local, frequent-stop service at Mount Baker, running on Martin Luther King Jr. Way South to Rainier Beach and towards Skyway and Renton. On weekends, a Trailhead Direct shuttle connects Mount Baker Transit Center to several popular hiking trails in the Issaquah Alps.

References

External links

Sound Transit Rider Guide

2009 establishments in Washington (state)
Link light rail stations in Seattle
Railway stations in the United States opened in 2009